Shaykh Dr. Aaidh ibn Abdullah al-Qarni (also spelt al-Qarnee and ʻĀʼiḍ Quranī, born 1 January 1959), is a Saudi Islamic Muslim scholar, author, and activist.

Al-Qarni is best known for his self-help book La Tahzan (Don't Be Sad), which is aimed at Muslims and non-Muslims alike.  

Al-Quarni is on the United States do not fly list and was barred entry in 2012 and 2015 to attend a convention in Chicago.

Condolences over the death of the son of Salman al-Ouda and his wife were given on Twitter by Aid al-Qarni.

Books & Poetry Collections
أسعد امرأة في العالم (You Can Be the Happiest Woman in the World (A Treasure Chest Of Reminders)) 
"La Tahzan (Don't Be Sad)"
Taj Al Mada'ih (Poetry of Al Qarni) 
L Alah Al Allh 
Mamlakat Al Bayan
Masareh Al Ushaq 
Mojtama Al Muthol 
Muhamad Kanak tara 
سلعة الله غالية 
Qisat Al Tamooh 
Siyat Al Qoloob 
Taj Al Madaeh 
Tohaf Nabawiya 
Torjuman Al Sunnah 
على مائدة القرآن 
Wa Jaat Sakarat Al Mawet 
Walaken Konoo Rabaniyin

On TV & media

Assassination attempt
On 1 March 2016, Al-Qarni was shot and wounded in an assassination attempt in Zamboanga City in the Philippines, where he held a lecture at an auditorium of the Western Mindanao State University. He was shot by a man wearing a school uniform of the institution's engineering college as the cleric left the auditorium after the lecture.

The gunman was shot dead and authorities recovered a student's driver license and a local government I.D. identifying a man as a local 21-year old Filipino. The police are not ruling out possibilities that these recovered items were forged and the university couldn't confirm immediately if the man is an enrolled student of the institution.

J M Berger of the Program on Extremism at George Washington University suspects that the attempted assassination has links to the militant group, Islamic State since Al-Qarni was listed as a target for assassination in the group's magazine Dabiq. It was later confirmed the gunman was a Sunni Muslim.

See also 

 Islam in Saudi Arabia
 Mohamad al-Arefe
 Saleh Al Maghamsi
 Salman al-Ouda
 Qur'an miracles

References

External links 

Video Lectures by Al-Qarni
Guidance of the Prophet in Fasting by Aa'id 'Abdullâh al-Qarnî
How does the Heart fast by Aa'id 'Abdullâh al-Qarnî
Ramadan: The Month of Standing Up at Night by Aa'id 'Abdullâh al-Qarnî
Other articles by al-Qarni 

د. #عائض_القرني @Dr_alqarnee
د. #عائض_القرني

Muslim writers
Saudi Arabian Islamists
Saudi Arabian activists
Saudi Arabian writers
20th-century Saudi Arabian poets
Shooting survivors
People involved in plagiarism controversies
1959 births
Living people
Saudi Arabian Sunni Muslims
Saudi Arabian scholars
Imam Muhammad ibn Saud Islamic University alumni
21st-century Saudi Arabian poets